Calliandra chilensis is a species of flowering plants of the genus Calliandra in the family Fabaceae.

References

Germplasm Resources Information Network: Calliandra 

chilensis
Endemic flora of Chile
Taxa named by George Bentham